Mehmet Akif is a Turkish masculine given name. Notable people with the name include:

 Mehmet Akif Ersoy (1873–1936), Turkish poet
 Mehmet Akif Pirim (born 1968), Turkish sport wrestler

See also
 Akif
 Mehmet

Turkish masculine given names